was a commander and daimyō in the service of Tokugawa Ieyasu in Japan during the Azuchi-Momoyama and Edo periods.

In 1563, when an uprising against Ieyasu occurred in Mikawa Province, Masanobu took the side of the peasants against Ieyasu at Battle of Batogahara. He fled from the Tokugawa, rejoining them in the 1570s or 1580s at the behest of Ōkubo Tadayo, and accompanied Ieyasu as he crossed Iga Province following the assassination of Oda Nobunaga at Honnō-ji. 

In 1600, Masanobu joined Tokugawa Hidetada's army for the march along the Nakasendō. En route, however, Hidetada attacked Sanada Masayuki at Ueda Castle against Masanobu's advice, and together they arrived late for the Battle of Sekigahara. 

Masanobu was a member of the Tokugawa shogunate and ruled a Han in Sagami Province assessed at 22,000 koku. He was present at the siege of Osaka in 1614. Masanobu died several weeks after Ieyasu in 1616.

References

Further reading

1538 births
1616 deaths
Rōjū
Honda clan
Fudai daimyo